Menegazzia platytrema is a species of lichen found in Australia.

References

See also
List of Menegazzia species

platytrema
Lichen species
Lichens described in 1887
Taxa named by Johannes Müller Argoviensis
Lichens of Australia